Alan Powell may refer to:

Alan Powell (actor) (born 1985), American actor and singer
Alan Powell (drummer), British musician
Alan Powell (entrepreneur) (born 1967), American businessman
Alan Powell (historian) (1936–2020), Australian historian and author
Alan Powell (politician) (born 1951), American politician from Georgia

See also
Allan Powell (1876–1948), Chairman of the BBC Board of Governors